Uppaka is a village in Pinapaka Mandal in Bhadradri Kothagudem district of Telangana state, India. It belongs to Telangana region .

References 

Villages in Bhadradri Kothagudem district